Elections to West Lindsey District Council were held on 4 May 2006. One third of the council was up for election and the Conservative Party lost overall control of the council to no overall control. The Liberal Democrat party took overall control of the council two weeks later after a by-election victory in Lea ward.

After the election, the composition of the council was:
 Liberal Democrat 18
 Conservative 17
 Independent 2

Election result

Ward results

References

 2006 West Lindsey election result
 Ward results

2006
2006 English local elections
2000s in Lincolnshire